Michelle Anne Young (born June 3, 1993) is an American television personality. She received national recognition as the runner-up on season 25 of The Bachelor, and as the star of season 18 of The Bachelorette.

Early life and education

Young was born in St. Louis Park, Minnesota to parents LaVonne and Ephraim Young, and was raised in nearby Woodbury. She has two siblings, Angela and Alex. She was a star basketball player at Woodbury High School, and played Division I basketball at Bradley University on an athletic scholarship. She graduated from Bradley in 2015 with a degree in elementary education.

Television career

The Bachelor

Young first appeared as a contestant on Matt James' season of The Bachelor. She entered in the third week of the competition, where she made it to the final two but was rejected in favor of fellow contestant Rachael Kirkconnell.

The Bachelorette

Young and Katie Thurston were announced as the leads of consecutive seasons of The Bachelorette on March 15, 2021, during the Bachelor season 25 "After the Final Rose" special.

Bachelor Happy Hour 
Young was announced as the new co-host on Bachelor Happy Hour with Becca Kufrin in March 2022.

Personal life
Outside of her appearances on The Bachelor franchise, Young works as a fifth grade teacher at Echo Park Elementary School in Burnsville, Minnesota. She was previously employed as a fourth grade teacher at Normandale Hills Elementary School in Bloomington.

On September 9, 2021, Young got engaged to Nayte Olukoya, whom she chose as the winner on her season of The Bachelorette. They announced their breakup on June 17, 2022.

Filmography

References

External links

1993 births
Living people
African-American schoolteachers
Bachelor Nation contestants
Bradley University alumni
People from Woodbury, Minnesota